When Incubus Attacks Volume 2 is a live album/DVD released by the band Incubus in 2001. The main feature of the DVD is a collection of songs performed at the Sno-Core festival. Also included on the DVD are official music videos for all the bands singles released to that point.  Included is an extra video for Anti-Gravity Love Song, a portion from an acoustic concert that the band played, and out-takes from the band backstage while at the festival, among other features.

Video contents
 GIGANTE ESPECIALLE! INTRO
 New Skin (live)
 Privilege (live)
 Favorite Things (live)
 Vitamin (live)
 Pardon Me (live)
 Warmth (live)
 Make Yourself (live)
 Calgone (live)
 When It Comes (live)
 Redefine (live)
 ON THE BUS
 SCENES FROM THE GREEN ROOM
 Pardon Me (MadTV)
 LIVE @ CHICAGO
 BEATIN' LAS VEGAS
 Take Me To Your Leader (official video)
 Summer Romance (live)
 A Certain Shade of Green (official video)
 Pardon Me (official video)
 ON THE SET: STELLAR
 Stellar (official video)
 I Miss You (official video)
 ON THE SET: DRIVE
 Drive (official video)
 DISCOSABOROSO
 AKOOSTIK KALI (Acoustic Concert)
 Clean
 A Certain Shade of Green
 The Warmth
 Summer Romance (Antigravity Love Song)
 PROPS & MORE PROPS

References

Incubus (band) albums
1999 live albums
Live video albums
1999 video albums